Soiled is a 1925 American silent drama film directed by Fred Windemere and starring Kenneth Harlan, Vivian Martin and Mildred Harris.

Cast
 Kenneth Harlan as Jimmie York 
 Vivian Martin as Mary Brown 
 Mildred Harris as Pet Darling 
 Johnnie Walker as Wilbur Brown 
 Mary Alden as Mrs. Brown 
 Robert Cain as John Duane 
 Wyndham Standing as James P. Munson 
 Maude George as Bess Duane 
 Alec B. Francis as Rollo Tetheridge

References

Bibliography
 Munden, Kenneth White. The American Film Institute Catalog of Motion Pictures Produced in the United States, Part 1. University of California Press, 1997.

External links
 

1925 films
1925 drama films
1920s English-language films
American silent feature films
Silent American drama films
Films directed by Fred Windemere
American black-and-white films
1920s American films